Birmingham-Jefferson County Transit Authority (BJCTA) is the public transportation operator in the city of Birmingham, Alabama. Created in 1972 to take over transit operations from private operators, it operates 109 buses on 38 routes. It also operates paratransit and "vintage trolley" (trolley-replica bus) services.

General information 
BJCTA operated under the branding MAX, or Metro Area Express.(BJCTA)
BJCTA provides fixed route and paratransit service to a service area of more than 200 square miles with a demand population base of nearly 400,000. The service area includes Birmingham, Bessemer, Fairfield, Homewood, Mountain Brook, Hoover, and Vestavia Hills. BJCTA carries out its commitment to air quality and pollution control by operating only CNG buses.
BJCTA Hours of Operation
Buses
Monday – Friday
4:00 A.M. – 11:30 P.M. (CST)
Weekend & Holidays
4:00 A.M. – 12:00 A.M. (CST)
No Sunday service.

Fare prices 
$1.25 – Adult one way
$1.50 – 2-hour pass
$0.60 – Disabled/Medicare card holders/Senior citizens
$0.80 – Student fare (K-12)
$3 – All day pass (Adult)
$1.50 – All day pass (Disabled/Medicare card holders/Senior citizens)
$44 – Monthly Pass (Adult)
$36 – Monthly Pass (College student)
$25 – Monthly Pass (Student (K-12))
$21 – Monthly Pass (Disabled/Medicare card holders/Senior citizens)
Free – Kids below 5 with fare-paying rider (limit 3)

Paratransit (VIP) Hours of Operation 

Buses/Vans
Monday – Friday
5:00 A.M. – 10:00 P.M. (CST)
Paratransit Service is a shared-ride service using both Buses and Vans to accommodate its customer.
No Sunday service for VIP/Paratransit.

Central Station Ticket Counter Hours of Operation 
Office Hours
Monday – Friday 6:00 A.M.- 9:00 A.M. Saturday: 6:00 A.M. – 6:00 P.M. (CST)
Sunday: Office is closed

Customer Information Center Hours of Operation 
(Routes, Schedules and Trip Planning Assistance)
Office Hours
Monday – Friday 4:00 A.M.- 9:00 P.M. Saturday: 6:00 A.M. – 9:00 P.M. (CST)
Sunday: Office is closed

Fixed routes 
1 South Bessemer/UAB Medical West/Wal-Mart
1 South Bessemer Express
3 Jefferson/Wenonah
5 Ensley/Wylam
6 Pratt/Ensley
8 Sixth Avenue South
12 Highland Avenue
14 Palisades/Barbara Court
17 Century Plaza/Eastwood Mall
18 Fountain Heights
20 Zion City/Airport
22 Tarrant City/Inglenook
23 North Birmingham/Collegeville
25 Center Point/Jefferson State
26 Jefferson State
28 South Eastlake/Roebuck Shopping Center
31 Hwy 31 Limited Stop
38 Graymont/Ensley
39 Homewood/Wildwood
40 Fairmont/Hooper City
41 Fairfield/Western Hills Mall
42 Homewood/Brookwood Mall
43 Birmingham Zoo
44 Montclair
45 Bessemer/Jonesboro
45 Express/Western Hills Mall
48 South Powderly
50 Mountain Brook/Cherokee Bend
50 Mountain Brook/Hermitage
51 Mountain Brook/Cahaba
52 UAB/Southside Loop
72 Center Point Express
91 East/West Dart
95 Westend Shuttle
96 Titusville Shuttle
Pilot 201 Hwy 280 Commuter
280 Hwy 280 Limited Stop

Airport Shuttle 
Beginning in December 2015, BJCTA introduced two new express Airport Shuttle routes from downtown Birmingham hotels directly to Birmingham–Shuttlesworth International Airport. One bus serves Northside hotels and the other bus serves Southside hotel. The Airport Shuttle routes operate hourly on Mondays through Saturdays and the fare is $5.00.

Fleet 

 56 standard buses
 43 Orion VII CNG LF buses
 10 CNG "vintage trolleys" (trolley-replica buses)
 22 paratransit buses

References 
 bjcta.org Historical
 About Us
 BJCTA 2009 Capital and Operating Budget

External links 
Birmingham-Jefferson County Transit Authority homepage
 

Transit agencies in Alabama
Bus transportation in Alabama
Government agencies established in 1972
Transit authorities with natural gas buses